Simple (or Streaming) Text Oriented Message Protocol (STOMP), formerly known as TTMP, is a simple text-based protocol, designed for working with message-oriented middleware (MOM).  It provides an interoperable wire format that allows STOMP clients to talk with any message broker supporting the protocol.

Overview
The protocol is broadly similar to HTTP, and works over TCP using the following commands:
CONNECT
SEND
SUBSCRIBE
UNSUBSCRIBE
BEGIN
COMMIT
ABORT
ACK
NACK
DISCONNECT

Communication between client and server is through a "frame" consisting of a number of lines.  The first line contains the command, followed by headers in the form <key>: <value> (one per line), followed by a blank line and then the body content, ending in a null character.  Communication between server and client is through a MESSAGE, RECEIPT or ERROR frame with a similar format of headers and body content.

Example
 SEND
 destination:/queue/a
 content-type:text/plain
 
 hello queue a
 ^@

Implementations
These are some MOM products that support STOMP:
Apache ActiveMQ, 
Fuse Message Broker
HornetQ
Open Message Queue (OpenMQ)
RabbitMQ (message broker, has support for STOMP) 
syslog-ng through its STOMP destination plugin

A list of implementations is also maintained on the STOMP web site.

External links
STOMP website

Internet protocols
Application layer protocols
Message-oriented middleware